This article lists events that occurred during 2000 in Estonia.

Incumbents
President – Lennart Meri 
Prime Minister – Mart Laar

Events
Estonian Information Technology College established.

Births

Deaths
2 June – Lepo Sumera, composer (b. 1950)
28 October – Aare Laanemets, actor and theatre director (b. 1954)

See also
 2000 in Estonian football
 2000 in Estonian television

References

 
2000s in Estonia
Estonia
Estonia
Years of the 20th century in Estonia